Nelligan is a Canadian drama film, directed by Robert Favreau and released in 1991. A biopic of Quebec poet Émile Nelligan, the film stars Marc Saint-Pierre as the adolescent Nelligan and Michel Comeau as the adult Nelligan after his confinement to an insane asylum.

The film also stars Luc Morissette and Lorraine Pintal as Nelligan's parents, Gabriel Arcand as his mentor Eugène Seers, David La Haye as his friend and colleague Arthur de Bussières, Dominique Leduc as his friend Idola Saint-Jean, Christian Bégin as poet Jean Charbonneau, and Gilles Pelletier as poet Louis-Honoré Fréchette. A key theme of the film is that Nelligan was a poète maudit continually pulled in different directions by opposing forces, including the conflicting cultural identities of his Irish-Canadian father and his French-Canadian mother, the competing influences of Seers and Fréchette on his writing, and a nearly asexual ambivalence in his personal relationships with both Bussières and Saint-Jean. The film also posits that Nelligan was subject to incestuous advances by his mother.

The film received two Genie Award nominations at the 12th Genie Awards in 1991, for Best Cinematography (Guy Dufaux) and Best Costume Design (François Laplante).

References

External links

1991 films
Canadian biographical drama films
1990s biographical drama films
Films directed by Robert Favreau
Films set in Quebec
1991 LGBT-related films
LGBT-related drama films
Canadian LGBT-related films
1991 drama films
French-language Canadian films
1990s Canadian films